Alexander Tomasovich Mirsky (born 20 March 1964) is a Latvian politician of Russian and Jewish descent.

Biography 

Mirsky was born in Vilnius. In 1986 he graduated in civil engineering from the Kaunas Polytechnic Institute. He worked as a building project leader from 1986 to 1989 and from 1990 to 1992, taking a one year break for service in the Soviet Army as commander of a radiation reconnaissance unit. Upon ending his service, with the rank of first lieutenant, he resumed his work in construction.

In 1992, Mirsky was made a technical director and seven years later became the general manager of a construction company. He retired from business to become an adviser to the mayor of Riga Gundars Bojārs from 2001 until 2005, later being elected to the Saeima, the Latvian parliament 2006 until 2009.

From July 2009 to July 2014 he was 1 of 9 Latvian MEPs in the European parliament, a member of the Harmony party elected as part of the Harmony Centre electoral alliance. He was affiliated with the Socialists and Democrats parliamentary group. Mirsky was a member of the Committee on Foreign Affairs and a substitute in the Committee on Regional Development. In 2014 he ran as a candidate of his own political party Alternative and was not re-elected at the European election.

References

External links
 Official website of the Alternative party

1964 births
Living people
Latvian people of Russian-Jewish descent
Deputies of the Saeima
Harmony Centre MEPs
MEPs for Latvia 2009–2014
Kaunas University of Technology alumni